Bess Wohl is an American playwright, screenwriter, and actress whose plays include Grand Horizons, Small Mouth Sounds, and the book for the musical Pretty Filthy with composer/lyricist Michael Friedman and The Civilians.

Early life
Wohl grew up in Brooklyn, New York, where she developed a love of theater.  She went to Harvard College for a BA in English, and then went to the Yale School of Drama for an MFA in acting. While at Yale, she created the play Cats Talk Balk, which went on to the New York International Fringe Festival, where it won Best Overall Production.

Career
Wohl's plays have been produced in numerous venues in New York City and around the United States.

Pretty Filthy, which ran Off-Broadway from January 2015 to March 1, 2015, was nominated for the 2015 Lucille Lortel Award, Outstanding Musical, and the 2015 Drama Desk Award, Outstanding Musical. Bess also won the 2015 Sam Norkin Special Drama Desk Award for “establishing herself as an important voice in New York theater, and having a breakthrough year.”

Small Mouth Sounds premiered Off-Broadway at Ars Nova in 2015 to wide critical acclaim. The play also was produced in 2016 at the Off-Broadway Signature Theatre and has been performed in a US national tour in 2017. Wohl won the Outer Critics Circle John Gassner Award, presented for an American play, preferably by a new playwright for Small Mouth Sounds in 2017.

Wohl's Grand Horizons began previews on Broadway at the Hayes Theater, presented by Second Stage Theater on December 23, 2019 and opened on January 23, 2020. This play marked her Broadway debut. Grand Horizons premiered at the Williamstown Theatre Festival in July 2019, directed by Leigh Silverman. The play is co-commissioned by Williamstown Theatre Festival and Second Stage Theater. Grand Horizons was nominated for the 2020 Tony Award for Best Play.

Her play Camp Siegfried opened at The Old Vic theatre in London in September 2021.

Honors and awards

|-
|2020
|Grand Horizons
|Tony Award for Best Play
|

References

External links
Internet Broadway Database

21st-century American dramatists and playwrights
Yale School of Drama alumni
Living people
American women dramatists and playwrights
Harvard College alumni
Writers from Brooklyn
21st-century American women writers
Year of birth missing (living people)